José Alcoverro y Amorós (Tivenys, Catalonia, 1835 — Madrid, December 9, 1908) was a Spanish sculptor, a pupil of José Piquer.

Alcoverro was a virtuoso modeller who specialised in realistic portraiture, and whose penchant for realism animated both his religious compositions, often selected for their inherent drama, such as the Ishmael Fainting of Thirst (1867), which brought him to public attention) and his allegorical official commissions. He exhibited in the Madrid annual expositions from 1867 to 1907.

Among his works in Madrid are:

 the figures of Alonso Berruguete, Alfonso X the Wise and Isidore of Seville at the Biblioteca Nacional de España, 1892
 a monument to Agustín Argüelles, 1902
 figures of Economy and Bookkeeping on the façade of the Banco Central Hispano, 1904
 allegorical figure of Agriculture, on the monument to Alfonso XII, in the Parque del Buen Retiro, 1907)
 the monument to Padre Francisco Piquer, Monte de Piedad

Notes

External links

José Alcoverro (esculturaurbana.com)
Grove ArtNet: José Alcoverro

1835 births
1908 deaths
Spanish sculptors
Spanish male sculptors
Architectural sculptors
People from Tarragona